Øvre Eiker is a municipality in the traditional and electoral district Buskerud in Viken county, Norway. It is part of the traditional region of Eiker.  The administrative centre of the municipality is the village of Hokksund.  The old municipality of Eiker was divided into Øvre Eiker (upper Eiker) and Nedre Eiker (lower) on 1 July 1885.

As of 2015, more employees worked for the [municipal] government and in the service sector, than in any other field of employment; even fewer—16 %—are employed in construction or in [electrical] power companies and water companies; [13%] work in the manufacturing sector.

General information

Name
The Old Norse form of the name was Eikjar. The name is the plural form of eiki which means "oak wood". The meaning of Øvre Eiker is "(the) upper (part of) Eiker". (The municipality of Eiker was divided in 1885.)

Coat-of-arms
The coat-of-arms is from modern times.  They were granted on 24 October 1981.  The arms show three silver oak leaves and two acorns on a blue background.  The oak is a canting element, since Eik means oak in the Norwegian language.

(See also coat-of-arms of Eigersund, Nedre Eiker, Songdalen and Tingvoll)

Geography
Øvre Eiker is a lush valley along Drammenselva with Modum to the north and Drammen to the east. To the south flows Eikeren watercourse, which is dominated by the contiguous Lakes Eikeren and Fiskumvannet. Eikeren is 156 Meters deep and is partly located in Holmestrand municipality in the south. The municipality's highest point, Myrehogget, 707 meters above sea level. is located west, between Øvre Eiker and Flesberg municipality.

About half of the municipality's inhabitants live in the municipal center Hokksund, which in 2021 had 9,514 inhabitants, the rest live mainly in the settlements Vestfossen, Skotselv, Ormåsen, and Darbu.

The municipality is part of the Drammen region and Buskerudbyen, which is a collaboration within transport, environment and health.

Energy 
Hakavik Power Station, startpoint of 55 kV single phase AC grid for traction current.

Notable residents

 Christopher Borgersen Hoen (1767 in Eiker – 1845) farmer and rep. at the Norwegian Constituent Assembly at Eidsvoll in 1814
 Jonas Lie (1833 at Hokksund – 1908) novelist, poet, and playwright
 Olaf Mørch Hansson (1856 in Øvre Eiker – 1912) an actor, theatre director and journalist
 Christopher Hornsrud (1859 in Skotselv – 1960) Prime Minister of Norway in 1928
 Henny Dons (1874 at Aker – 1966) a Norwegian educator and inner missionary 
 Hans Dons (1882 in Øvre Eiker – 1940) Navy officer, first manned flight in Norway
 Thina Thorleifsen (1885 in Hokksund – 1959) a politician, active in the women's movement
 Else Halling (1899 in Øvre Eiker – 1987) a Norwegian textile artist
 Harald Henschien (1902 at Øvre Hoen – 1968) accordionist, accordion manufacturer, editor
 Aage Møst (1923 in Skotselv – 2011) a journalist and sports official
 Thorleif Enger (born 1943 in Øvre Eiker) former CEO of Yara International
 Per Olaf Lundteigen (born 1953) farmer and Øvre Eiker municipal councillor 2003/07 
 Nikolai Hængsle (born 1978 in Skotselv) a Norwegian bass guitarist, member of BigBang
 Masud Gharahkhani (born 1982) an Iranian-Norwegian politician, brought up in Skotselv

Sport 
 Randi Thorvaldsen (1925 in Fiskum – 2011) a champion speedskater in the early 1950s 
 Jorunn Horgen (born 1966 in Hokksund) a windsurfer, world champion in 1980's & 90's
 Mona Bollerud (born 1968 in Fiskum) former biathlete, World Championship medallist
 Gustav Wikheim (born 1993 in Hokksund) a Norwegian footballer with over 200 club caps

International relations

Twin towns — Sister cities
The following cities are twinned with Øvre Eiker:
  Kerteminde, Region of Southern Denmark, Denmark
  Lempäälä, Western Finland, Finland
  Ulricehamn, Västra Götaland County, Sweden

Gallery

References

External links

Municipal fact sheet from Statistics Norway

 
Municipalities of Buskerud
Municipalities of Viken (county)